Neotropacarus is a genus of mites in the family Acaridae.

Species
 Neotropacarus bakeri (Collyer, 1967)
 Neotropacarus excavatus (Niedbala, 1981)
 Neotropacarus mumai (Cunliffe, 1964)

References

Acaridae